Dodoma F.C., previously known as Polisi Dodoma, is a Tanzanian football club based in Dodoma. Their home games are played at 10,000 capacity Jamhuri Stadium. They played in the Tanzanian First Division League in the 2017/18 season. As of 2022, they play in the Tanzanian Premier League.

References

External links 
 soccerway.com
 Welt Football archive

Football clubs in Tanzania
Dodoma
Dodoma